William of Chartres or Guillaume de Chartres may refer to:

Guillaume de Ferrières (d. ?1204), vidame of Chartres and troubadour
William of Chartres (Templar) (d. 1219), grand master of the Knights Templar
William of Chartres (Dominican) (d. c. 1280), chaplain and biographer of Louis IX of France